Gopalpura is a patwar circle and village in ILRC Madhorajpura in Phagi tehsil in Jaipur district, Rajasthan. Gopalpura is also a patwar circle for nearby villages, Ramsinghpura and Shri Ramjipura.

In Gopalpura, there are 190 households with total population of 1,292 (with 51.16% males and 48.84% females), based on 2011 census. Total area of village is 10.09 km2.  There is one primary school in the village.

References

Cities and towns in Jaipur district